Bicton is an electoral district of the Legislative Assembly of Western Australia. It is located in Perth's southern suburbs, and named after the riverside suburb of Bicton.

Bicton was created by the Western Australian Electoral Commission in a 2015 redistribution, and elected its first member at the 2017 state election. It incorporates areas that previously fell into the seats of Alfred Cove, Bateman, Fremantle and Willagee.

Geography
At the 2017 state election, Bicton includes the suburbs of Attadale, Bicton, and Melville in their entireties, most of East Fremantle and Palmyra, and smaller portions of Alfred Cove, Fremantle, and Myaree. It is bounded by Stirling Highway to the west, High Street and Leach Highway to the south, North Lake Road to the east and the Swan River to the north.

Members for Bicton
Bicton was created as a notionally safe Liberal seat with a majority of 10 percent over Labor, and was reckoned as the successor to the safe Liberal seat of Alfred Cove. However, in 2017, it was swept up in a massive Labor wave that swept through Perth, with Labor's Lisa O'Malley winning the seat on a swing of 13 percent. She defeated Matt Taylor, who had been the Liberal member for Bateman.

At the 2021 state election, O'Malley saw her margin swell to 15.6 percent, turning Bicton into a safe Labor seat in one stroke.

Election results

References

External links
 ABC election profiles: 2017
 WAEC district maps: 2015

Electoral districts of Western Australia
2017 establishments in Australia
Constituencies established in 2017